Scott Christopher Lindsey (born May 20, 1996) is an American professional basketball player for the Maine Celtics of the NBA G League. He played college basketball for the Northwestern Wildcats.

High school career
Lindsey was a star basketball player at Fenwick High School. Before his senior season, Lindsey broke his leg during a pick-up game at a summer recruiting visit to Vanderbilt. He joined coach Chris Collins's first recruiting class at Northwestern.

College career
Lindsey was a four year player for Northwestern. As a freshman he played 31 games and started 10 games and averaged 4.4 points and 2.3 rebounds per game. As a sophomore he played 31 games and 3 starts and put up 6.4 points, 2.3 rebounds and 1.4 assists per game. Lindsey was named Big Ten player of the week on January 16, 2017 after contributing 22 points, eight rebounds, five assists and three steals in a win over Iowa. As a junior, he was a key piece along with Bryant McIntosh to lead Northwestern to a win over 9th seeded Vanderbilt and a Round of 32 appearance in the NCAA Tournament. He put up 14.1 points, and 3.8 rebounds per game.  He was recognized as a 2017 All-Big Ten team 3rd team selection by the coaches and Honorable Mention by the media. As a senior he came in at 19th in school history with 1,270 points and averaged 15.2 points, 3.8 rebounds and 1.7 assists per game, hitting 36.2 percent of his 3-pointers.

Professional career
Lindsey played in the 2018 NBA Summer League with the Detroit Pistons. He joined the roster of their G League affiliate, the Grand Rapids Drive. In December 2018, Lindsay suffered a season-ending injury and was released by the Drive. He averaged 10.5 points and 3.7 rebounds in 15 games.

For the 2019–20 season, Lindsey joined the Erie BayHawks of the G League. On March 3, 2020, Lindsey had 16 points, five rebounds, three steals and two assists in a loss to the Long Island Nets. He averaged 10.4 points and 3.7 rebounds per game.

Lindsey signed with Benfica of the Portuguese Basketball League on June 21, 2020.

Lindsey was selected with the 17th pick in the 2021 NBA G League draft by the Windy City Bulls.

Lindsey signed with the Saskatchewan Rattlers of the Canadian Elite Basketball League on April 27, 2022.

Maine Celtics (2022–present)
On October 24, 2022, Lindsey joined the Maine Celtics training camp roster.

References

External links
 Northwestern Wildcats bio
 Twitter

1996 births
Living people
American men's basketball players
American expatriate basketball people in Canada
American expatriate basketball people in Portugal
Basketball players from Illinois
Erie BayHawks (2019–2021) players
Grand Rapids Drive players
Maine Celtics players
Northwestern Wildcats men's basketball players
Saskatchewan Rattlers players
Shooting guards
S.L. Benfica basketball players
Sportspeople from Oak Park, Illinois
Windy City Bulls players